Bunbury is an electoral district of the Legislative Assembly in the Australian state of Western Australia.

The district, taking in the city of Bunbury, has existed continuously since 1890, being one of the original 30 seats contested at the 1890 general election. From 1974 to 2005 the seat was always held by the party of government, making it an effective bellwether. Two early Premiers of Western Australia, Sir John Forrest and Sir Newton Moore, held Bunbury during their time in office. However, after Moore's retirement in 1911, another member for Bunbury was not appointed to a cabinet post until 2008, when John Castrilli became Minister for Local Government under Colin Barnett.

Members for Bunbury

Election results

References

External links
 ABC election profiles: 2005 2008
 WAEC district maps: current boundaries, previous distributions

Bunbury
Electoral district
1890 establishments in Australia
Constituencies established in 1890